The Accessories Council Excellence Awards, known as the ACE Awards, were created in 1996 by the Accessories Council to pay homage to individuals and groups who have helped raise awareness of the accessories industry. Their purpose is to celebrate those who have had a positive impact on accessory consumption during the prior year. Nominees are voted on by accessory-industry insiders, retailers, the Accessories Council Board of Directors and the fashion press. Winners are announced in advance of the annual event, which usually takes place at the beginning of November.

Accessories Council
The awards are handed out by the Accessories Council, a United States-based not-for-profit trade association that was established in 1994 with the mission of increasing consumer use and awareness of accessories. Karen Giberson has been the group’s president since 2005. Its previous president, Sheila Block, led the group from 1996 to 2005.

The organization sponsors educational seminars, networking events, seasonal trend reports, marketing and advertising co-op initiatives, design and marketing awards for area fashion students, an annual silent auction, and the black tie ACE Awards Gala, an annual tribute to the leaders of the accessory industry.

Past winners

2021
 Super Hero Award: Iris Apfel
 Allen Edmonds/Caleres
 Carolina Herrera/Wes Gordon
 Christian Siriano
 Crocs
 LaQuan Smith
 Qurate Retail Group
 ShopBop
 Karyn Schoenbart/The NPD Group 
 Special recognition to: The Optical Industry, Aether Diamonds, Blessings in a Backpack, Marlyn Schiff

2019
 Business Launch Award: Rachael Ray
 Style Icon Award: Ciara
 Visionary Award: Steve Madden
 Designer of the Year: Todd Snyder
 Retailer of the Year: Saks Fifth Avenue

2018
 Breakthrough Award: Allbirds
 Style Ambassador: Tracee Ellis Ross
 American Heritage Award: Brooks Brothers

2017
 Breakthrough Award: Kendra Scott
 Style Icon Award: Betsey Johnson
 Style Ambassador: Eva Longoria
 Designer of the Year: Joseph Altuzarra
 Retailer of the Year: Shopbop

2016
 Brand Launch: Paul Andrew
 Brand Visionary: Sarah Jessica Parker
 Influencer: Jennifer Fisher
 Style Influencers: Daniel Lawson & Julianna Margulies
 Designer of the Year: Stuart Vevers
 Retailer of the Year: Bergdorf Goodman

2015
 Breakthrough Award: Ivanka Trump
 Influencers: Taraji P. Henson & Paolo Nieddu
 Designer of the Year: John Varvatos
 Retail Innovation: Moda Operandi

2014
 Brand Launch: Shinola
 Influencers: Kerry Washington and Lyn Paolo
 Style Ambassador: Flo Rida
 Designer of the Year: Proenza Schouler
 Retailer of the Year: Lord & Taylor

2013
 Brand Launch: Alexis Bittar
 Breakthrough Award: Rag & Bone
 Influencer: Kate Young
 Designer of the Year: Phillip Lim
 Retail Innovation: Warby Parker

2012
 Brand Launch: Theodora & Callum
 Influencer: Assouline
 Designer of the Year: Francisco Costa, Italo Zucchelli and Ulrich Grimm for Calvin Klein Collection
 Retail Innovation: Stella & Dot

2011
 Brand Launch: Marchesa
 Breakthrough Award: Rebecca Minkoff
 Influencer: Nicole Richie
 Designer of the Year: Philip Treacy
 Retailer of the Year: Tourneau

2010
 Brand Launch: Rachel Roy
 Designer of the Year: Alber Elbaz for Lanvin
 Retailer of the Year: Henri Bendel
 Stylemaker: Kanye West
 Hall of Fame: Tiffany & Co

2009
 Designer of the Year: Tomas Maier for Bottega Veneta
 Retailer of the Year: Zappos.com
 Accessory Visionary: Diane von Fürstenberg
 Stylemaker: Lady Gaga

2008
 Designer of the Year: Nicolas Ghesquière for Balenciaga
 Brand of the Year: Jimmy Choo
 Hall of Fame: Emilio Pucci
 Retailer of the Year: Banana Republic
 Innovator of the Year: Lorraine Schwartz

2007
 Designer of the Year: Marc Jacobs
 Retailer of the Year: Macy’s
 Fashion Influencer: Heidi Klum
 Fashion Innovator: Mandy Moore

2006
 ACE Award: Jennifer Lopez
 Designer of the Year: Michael Kors
 Retailer of the Year: Bergdorf Goodman

2005
 ACE Award: Mary-Kate Olsen & Ashley Olsen
 Designer of the Year: Oscar de la Renta
 Retailer of the Year: NeimanMarcus.com

2004
 ACE Award: Kim Cattrall
 Designer of the Year: Gordon Thompson III for Cole Haan
 Retailer of the Year: Bloomingdale’s

2003
 ACE Award: The Women of Broadway
 Designer of the Year: Reed Krakoff for Coach
 Retailer of the Year: Henri Bendel

2002
 ACE Award: Debra Messing
 Designer of the Year: Tom Ford for Yves Saint Laurent Rive Gauche
 Retailer of the Year: Lord & Taylor and Neiman Marcus (tie)

2001
 ACE Award: Tina Knowles

2000
 ACE Award: Patricia Field & Rebecca Weinberg

1999
 ACE Award: Linda Dano

1998
 ACE Award: Kathie Lee Gifford

1997
 ACE Award: Joan Rivers

References

Awards established in 1996
Fashion awards